The discography of Washington, D.C.-based rapper Tabi Bonney consists of at least three studio albums and various mixtapes.

A Fly Guy's Theme (2006)

Dope (2009)

Fresh (2010)

Discographies of American artists
Hip hop discographies